John P. Doll (born March 12, 1961) is a Minnesota politician and a former member of the Minnesota Senate who represented District 40, which includes portions of the cities of Burnsville, Savage and Bloomington in Dakota, Hennepin and Scott counties.  A Democrat, he was first elected in 2006. He was unseated by Republican Dan Hall in the 2010 general election.

Doll was a member of the Energy, Utilities, Technology and Communications, the Health, Housing and Family Security, and the Transportation committees. He also served on the Finance Subcommittee for the Transportation Budget and Policy Division.

Doll attended the University of Minnesota, Anoka-Ramsey Community College, and currently attends Normandale Community College. He resides in Burnsville with his wife Robyn.

References

External links 

Senator Doll Web Page
Minnesota Public Radio Votetracker: Senator John Doll
Project Vote Smart - Senator John Doll Profile
John Doll Campaign Web Site

1961 births
Living people
People from Burnsville, Minnesota
Democratic Party Minnesota state senators
University of Minnesota alumni
Anoka-Ramsey Community College alumni
21st-century American politicians